The FIFA World Cup, sometimes called the Football World Cup, but usually referred to simply as the World Cup, is an international association football competition contested by the men's national teams of the members of Fédération Internationale de Football Association (FIFA), the sport's global governing body. The championship has been awarded every four years since the first tournament in 1930, except in 1942 and 1946, due to World War II.

The tournament consists of two parts, the qualification phase and the final phase (officially called the World Cup Finals). The qualification phase, which currently take place over the three years preceding the Finals, is used to determine which teams qualify for the Finals. The current format of the Finals involves 32 teams competing for the title, at venues within the host nation (or nations) over a period of about a month. The World Cup Finals is the most widely viewed sporting event in the world, with an estimated 715.1 million people watching the 2006 tournament final.

This article is about the World Cup history of one of the leading nations in African football, Ghana. Ghana have appeared in the finals of the World Cup on four occasions, in 2006, 2010 where they reached the quarter-finals, 2014 and in 2022.

FIFA World Cup record
Ghana have qualified for four FIFA World Cup tournaments; 2006, 2010, 2014 and 2022.

In 2006 they were the only African side to advance to the Second Round of 2006 FIFA World Cup and were the sixth nation in a row from Africa to progress beyond the group stages of the World Cup. Ghana had the youngest team in the FIFA World Cup 2006 with an average age of 23 years and 352 days, and were praised for their improving performance. FIFA ranked Ghana 13th out of the 32 countries who competed in the tournament.

In the 2010 World Cup, Ghana progressed beyond the group stages, and reached the quarter-finals where they were eliminated by Uruguay. Ghana was defeated by Uruguay on penalties after Luis Suárez controversially handballed on the goal line deep into extra time, denying Ghana an almost certain winning goal. Had Ghana won their quarter final, they would have become the first African nation to progress to the semi finals of the world cup. Of the 32 countries that participated in the 2010 FIFA World Cup, FIFA ranked Ghana 7th.

In the 2014 and 2022 World Cup, Ghana was eliminated in the group stage.

By match

Record by opponent

Germany 2006
Head coach:  Ratomir Dujković

Italy vs Ghana

Czech Republic vs Ghana
Asamoah Gyan opened the scoring with a low left footed shot to the net from the edge of the penalty area. Gyan then missed a penalty in the second half when he hit his shot against the post in the 66th minute. Sulley Muntari got the second goal for Ghana in the 82nd minute, finishing a move with a left footed shot to the roof of the net from inside the penalty area.

Ghana vs United States
Ghana opened the scoring in the 22nd minute when Haminu Draman curled a low right footed shot past the goalkeeper from the left of the penalty area. The winning goal for Ghana was a penalty at the end of the first half which Stephen Appiah shot high right footed to the goalkeepers right.

Brazil vs Ghana Second Round Match

South Africa 2010
Coach:  Milovan Rajevac

Serbia vs Ghana
Asamoah Gyan scored only goal of the game came in the 85th minute from the penalty spot, shooting to the goalkeepers right after a handball offence by Zdravko Kuzmanovic.

Ghana vs Australia
Asamoah Gyan scored the equalizer for Ghana in the 25th minute from the penalty spot, shooting low to the goalkeepers left after a handball by Harry Kewell on the goal-line for which he was shown a straight red card.

Ghana vs Germany

United States vs Ghana
United States vs Ghana was played on 26 June 2010 at the Royal Bafokeng Stadium in Rustenburg. The match was watched by 19 million Americans, making it the most watched association football match in American television history. The match was won by Ghana in extra time, after Asamoah Gyan broke a 1–1 deadlock. Kevin-Prince Boateng scored the opening goal of the match for Ghana in the 5th minute. The goal followed an error by Ricardo Clark, who lost the ball to Ghana in midfield. Boateng took the ball to the edge of the penalty area, beating US goalkeeper Tim Howard with a low left foot shot. Landon Donovan equalised with a penalty kick in the 62nd minute, awarded after Jonathan Mensah fouled Clint Dempsey. The US had chances to win the game thereafter, but they were unable to get past Ghana's goalkeeper Richard Kingson. The match thus went to extra time. In the third minute, Gyan latched onto a high long ball, chesting it down and holding off two defenders before scoring the winner. After the match, Ghana's coach Milovan Rajevac hailed his side's achievement in becoming one of the "best eight teams in the world", but regretted the number of players that would miss the quarter-final against Uruguay because of injury or suspension. The president of the Soccer Federation, Sunil Gulati, lamented the team's failure to make the quarter-finals and thereby further raise the profile of the sport in the US.

Uruguay vs Ghana  
Uruguay and Ghana met on 2 July 2010 at Soccer City, Johannesburg for a place in the semi-final against the Netherlands. It was the first time that the teams had ever played each other in a senior competitive football match. After a dramatic 120 minutes of play (including extra time) that finished 1–1, Uruguay won in a penalty shoot-out 4–2.
Uruguay dominated the early periods of the match, but suffered an injury to captain Diego Lugano in the first half. Just before half-time, Ghana took the lead when Sulley Muntari was allowed time on the ball by Uruguay, and took advantage by scoring with a shot from 40 yards. After half-time, Diego Forlán pulled Uruguay level with a free kick from the left side of the field that went over the head of Ghana's goalkeeper Richard Kingson. While both teams had chances to win, the match proceeded to extra time as the scores remained level. Late in extra time, Ghana sent a free kick into the box; Luis Suárez blocked Stephen Appiah's shot on the goal line. On the rebound, Dominic Adiyiah's header was heading into the goal, but Suárez blatantly blocked the shot with his hands to save what would have been the extra-time winner and he was red carded. Asamoah Gyan missed the ensuing penalty kick off the crossbar and Suárez celebrated the miss. In the shootout, Gyan converted his penalty, as did everybody else until the 4th round of penalty kicks when Adiyiah's penalty was saved by Uruguayan goalkeeper Fernando Muslera. Uruguay's Maxi Pereira then hit his penalty kick over the bar. Muslera saved Captain John Mensah's, and Ghana's fifth, penalty. Sebastián Abreu converted Uruguay's fifth spot kick by lightly chipping it Panenka-style to win the match.
After the game, Suárez said, "I made the save of the tournament," and, referring to the infamous handball goal scored by Diego Maradona in the 1986 World Cup, claimed that "The 'Hand of God' now belongs to me." Suárez claimed he had no alternative and was acting out of instinct. Forlán agreed that Suárez saved the game, "Suárez this time, instead of scoring goals, he saved one, I think he saved the game. 
Ghana coach Milovan Rajevac said the play was an "injustice" and Suárez was labeled a "villain" and a "cheat". But Uruguay coach, Óscar Tabárez, said these labels were too harsh, "Well, there was a handball in the penalty area, there was a red card and Suárez was thrown out. Saying that Ghana were cheated out of the game is too harsh. We have to go by the rules. It might have been a mistake by my player but I do not like that word ‘cheating’."
Ghana was the last African team left in the tournament and if they had won, they would have been the first team from Africa to ever make the semifinals. But others viewed him as a hero who sacrificed himself in the semifinal for the unlikely chance that his team could win. A distraught Gyan conceded, "I would say Suárez is a hero now in his own country, because the ball was going in and he held it with his hand. He is a hero now."

Brazil 2014
Head coach:  James Kwesi Appiah

The final squad was announced on 1 June 2014. On 26 June 2014, midfielders Sulley Muntari and Kevin-Prince Boateng were sent home and indefinitely suspended from the national team for disciplinary reasons.

Ghana vs United States

Germany vs Ghana

Portugal vs Ghana

Qatar 2022

Group stage

Record players

Top goalscorers

References

External links
Ghana at FIFA

 
Ghana